Elizabeth Irma Coto García (born 20 April 1989) is a Salvadoran former footballer who played as a defender. She has been a member of the El Salvador women's national team.

International career
Coto capped for El Salvador at senior level during two CONCACAF W Championship qualifications (2010 and 2014) and the 2012 CONCACAF Women's Olympic Qualifying Tournament qualification.

See also
List of El Salvador women's international footballers

References

External links

1989 births
Living people
Salvadoran women's footballers
Women's association football defenders
El Salvador women's international footballers